The Albanian Volleyball Supercup (Women) is a competition featuring female professional volleyball clubs from Albania and consists in a single match between League and Cup winners of the season. It was founded in 1954 from the Albanian Federation of Volleyball. The team with the most trophies is KV Tirana with 1 cup*.

Winners
These are the winners of the Albanian Volleyball Supercup

Trophy Ranking

KV Tirana 1 time

 There are data missing for this tournament which will be added in the due course.

References

External links 
FSHV Official Website

See also
 Albanian Volleyball League (Women)
 Albanian Volleyball Cup (Women)

Volleyball in Albania